Franklin Raúl Chacón Colmenares (born February 12, 1979) is a Venezuelan former professional track and road racing cyclist.

Major results

2000
 1st Stage 5 Vuelta al Táchira
2001
 3rd  Under-23 road race, Pan American Championships
2002
 1st  National Time Trial Championships
 1st Stage 1 Vuelta a Bramon
 1st Stage 1 Vuelta al Táchira
 2nd Overall Vuelta a Venezuela
2003
 3rd  Individual time trial, Pan American Games
 4th Overall Vuelta a Venezuela
2004
 2nd Overall Vuelta a Venezuela
2005
 1st Stage 3 Vuelta Ciclista Aragua
 2nd Overall Vuelta a Tovar
 10th Overall Vuelta a Venezuela
1st Stage 3a
2006
 1st Stage 3 Vuelta al Tachira
 3rd Overall Vuelta a Cuba
 6th Overall Vuelta a Venezuela
2007
 1st Overall Vuelta al Estado Yaracuy
1st Stage 1
 1st Juegos del Alba
 2nd  Team pursuit, Pan American Championships
 2nd Overall Vuelta al Estado Portugesa
1st Stage 3
 3rd  Team pursuit, Pan American Games
2008
 1st Overall Vuelta a Yacambu-Lara
 1st Stage 1 Clásico Virgen de la Consolación de Táriba
 2nd Overall Vuelta a Venezuela
1st Stage 4
 3rd Clasico Aniversario Federacion Ciclista de Venezuela
 9th Overall Vuelta a Guatemala
1st Stages 1, 2 & 12
2009
 4th Overall Vuelta a Cuba
2013
 10th Overall Vuelta a Venezuela

References

External links

1979 births
Living people
Venezuelan male cyclists
Venezuelan track cyclists
Cyclists at the 2003 Pan American Games
Cyclists at the 2007 Pan American Games
Vuelta a Venezuela stage winners
Pan American Games medalists in cycling
Pan American Games bronze medalists for Venezuela
Central American and Caribbean Games silver medalists for Venezuela
Competitors at the 2002 Central American and Caribbean Games
Central American and Caribbean Games medalists in cycling
Medalists at the 2003 Pan American Games
Medalists at the 2007 Pan American Games
People from Táchira